Mahirwan Mamtani (born 2 November 1935 in Bhiria (Nawabshah) Sindh, British India) is painter, graphic and multimedia artist.

Mamtani grew up in India, studied there and moved 1966 to Germany, where he had been awarded a scholarship by DAAD (German Academic Exchange Service) to study painting at the Kunstakademie. Since that time he lives and works in and around Munich.

Early years
Already at the age of six in Sindh, Mahirwan Mamtani began to paint, mainly with charcoal and chalks on walls.  At the age of 12, due to the partition of India, in 1947 the family moved to Delhi. Because of miserable living conditions as a refugee, lying on sick bed he taught himself without proper schooling.  He used to doodle with pencil or pastels on paper.  However circumstances forced Mamtani to earn money doing several jobs and his urge to paint was suppressed due to lack of time and money.  After some years of such conditions, loneliness and hard work at self-education, Mamtani besides his jobs started studying for Bachelor of Arts and then joined evening classes at the Fine Arts Department of Delhi Polytechnic to study painting.  He obtained the National Diploma in 1962.  In 1966 he was awarded a scholarship by German Academic Exchange Service (DAAD) to study painting at the Academy of Fine Arts Munich under Prof. Franz Nagel.  Since then he is living with his family in and around the Munich and Bavaria area.

Career

Already at the beginning of his studies, Mamtani was aware of Kandinsky, one of the groundbreakers of modernism, who had been searching for spiritual dimensions in art.  For Mamtani it can go as far back as William Blake in the 18th century or extend to a German contemporary like Joseph Beuys, who was influenced by the anthroposophic teachings of Rudolf Steiner.

In Munich, in the 1960s, he was influenced by Constructivism, and with his Indian background, by Tantra art.  Out of these origins arose his "Centrovision" series, which – already in 1990 – consisted of more than 3000 works.

Quote

Some of his earlier multimedia projects were graphic animation films: CENTROVISION (1981) and FACES (1982). 
Starting in 1990 he built upon an idea from earlier (1985) works, where he had begun to let faces appear in some of his artwork. He performed dances wearing several mandala masks, which he had painted on wood, and recorded these dances in the form of photos and videos with the help of a self-timer.
He then painted over the surface of the resulting photo sheets with acrylic colours, creating a series of new mixed-media works of art which he called "Transmuted Fotos". During that time he also experimented with other mixed media.

From the year 2000 onwards, Mamtani created "Mandala Conscious Beings" where he focused on figurative paintings using mandala masks as central elements. This was driven by his urge to deal with human emotions (masks). His remarks were "We all are constantly wearing masks. We are changing the masks, but not removing them."

Around 2003, he also started working on earlier dance videos, recomposing them into new clips (some of them available on YouTube).

Accomplishments
Art Samples  External Weblinks
 Centrovision 727
 Website of Dhoomimal Art Centre, Neu Delhi showing six images
 Centrovision 57
Centrovison 65

In India Mamtani is counted among the Neo-Tantra artists Biren De, G.R. Santosh, K. C. S. Paniker, Sohan Qadri, Proffula Mohanti, Haridasan, Om Prakash Sharma, P.T. Reddy, Viswanathan. The group exhibited in several museums in Germany, USA and Australia.

In Europe, Mamtani belongs to a group of artists THE SPIRITUAL IN ART – Domenico Caneschi, Italy – Pietro Gentili, Italy – Guy Harloff, France – Joerg Anton Schulthess, Switzerland – Nora Ullmann, Israel.  This group was initiated in the 1970s by Dr. Walter Schönenberger, the director of museum in Lugano, who organised several exhibitions in Locarno, Aarau, Milano and Bochum.

Graphic editions
 Edition modern art galerie, Berlin
 Bruckmann Verlag, München
 Kunstverein München
 Galerie Toni Brechbühl, Grenchen
 Galerie Regio, Freiburg
 Galerie Becher, Wuppertal
 Edition Galerie Wassermann, München

Awards among others
 1976 Tokyo, 10th International Print Biennale
 1978 New Delhi, National Award in Painting, Lalit Kala Akademi

Literature

List of exhibitions

Exhibitions (selection of over 30 worldwide)

 1964  New Delhi AIFACS Gallery
 1967  München, Galerie Stenzel
 1967  Augsburg, Ecke Galerie
 1967  Mainz, Galerie Winfried Gurlitt
 1967  Zürich, Galerie La Fourmi´re
 1970  Berlin, modern art galerie
 1970  Grenchen, Galerie Toni Brechbühl
 1971  Heilbronn, Galerie Rota
 1972  München, Kunstverein
 1972  Wuppertal, Schauspielhaus
 1973  London, Commonwealth Art Gallery
 1974  München, Art Galerie Schwabylon
 1974  Wuppertal, Galerie Becher
 1975  New Delhi, Gallery Chanakya
 1976  Heilbronn, Galerie Lee Babel
 1979  New Delhi, Gallery Chanakya
 1985  München, Galerie Transart
 1986  New Delhi, Dhoomimal Art Centre
 1988  München, Galerie Rozmarin
 1991  New Delhi, Dhoomimal Art Centre
 1993  Hanau, Galerie Neunauge
 1994  Zürich, Galerie Gerhard Zähringer
 1995  New Delhi, LTG Art Gallery
 1998  Landsberg, Stadttheater
 2002  Hanau, Galerie Neunauge
 2009  New Delhi, Dhoomimal Art Centre

Group exhibitions (selection)

 1968  München, Kunstverein
 1969  München, Große Kunstausstellung Haus der Kunst
 1970 Berlin, Frühjahrsmesse
 1970 Basel, Internationale Kunstmesse Galerie Regio
 1970 München, Große Kunstausstellung Haus der Kunst
 1971 Basel, Mustermesse Galerie Brechbühl/modern art
 1971 München, Große Kunstausstellung Haus der Kunst
 1971 München, Kunstzone
 1971 Köln, Kunstmarkt Galerie Brechbühl/Galerie Regio
 1972 New Delhi, National Exhibition of Art Lalit Kala
 1972 Basel, Art '72 – Galerie Brechbühl/Galerie Regio
 1972 München, Große Kunstausstellung Haus der Kunst
 1972 München, Mandala in der zeitgenössischen Kunst
 1972 Düsseldorf, Internationaler Markt für aktuelle Kunst
 1973 New York, Young Artists '73
 1973 Locarno, Ipotesi per Unarte Simbolica
 1973 Milano, Situazione Simbolo
 1973 Düsseldorf, Internationaler Markt für aktuelle Kunst
 1973 New Delhi, National Exhibition of Art Lalit Kala
 1974 Segovia, Bienal Internacional de Obra Grafica Y ArteSeriado
 1975 New Delhi, Third International Triennale – India
 1975 Aarau, Kunsthalle – Weltanschauung als Bildidee-Weltschau
 1976 Bochum, Museum – Weltanschauung als Bildidee <- Weltschau
 1976 Tokyo, Museum of Modern Art, International Print Biennial
 1976 Nürnberg, Germanisches Nationalmuseum, Bild+Text
 1977 Melbourne, Western Pacific Print Biennale
 1977 Paris, Salon de Mai
 1978 New Delhi, Fourth International Triennale-India
 1978 Ljubljana, Moderna Galerija, International Art '78
 1978 Landau, Städtische Galerie
 1979 Tolentino, Biennale Internazionale dell Umorismo nell'Arte
 1980 Mannheim, Rosengarten, Surya Galerie
 1982 Darmstadt, Kunsthalle
 1982 Bergkamen, 6. bbb – Kunst zum Überleben
 1982 Ibiza, X Bienal Internacional
 1983 Stuttgart, Forum für Kulturaustausch
 1983 München, BBK Galerie der Künstler, Aufführung des Films 'Centrovision'
 1984 München, Große Kunstausstellung Haus der Kunst
 1984 Düsseldorf, Kunstmuseum der Stadt Düsseldorf
 1984 Wien, Kunsthaus, Bayerische Kunst Heute
 1984 Hannover, Kubus an der Aegidienkirche
 1984 Oberhausen, Kunstverein Oberhausen
 1984 Bayreuth, Iwalewa-Haus Universität Bayreuth
 1984 Tokyo, 15th International Art Biennale
 1985 Ljubljana, International Art Collection
 1986 Los Angeles, Neo-Tantra Wight Art Gallery UCL
 1986 New South Wales, Neo-Tantra-Art
 1986 Frankfurt, Buchmesse – Zeitgenössische Malerei
 1987 Warschau, Contemporary Indian Painting
 1987 Moskau/Leningrad/Riga, Festival of India
 1987 Tolentino, Biennale Internazionale dell Umorismo nell'Arte
 1987 München, Transart Galerie, Stille Räume
 1988 St. Gallen, Stadttheater
 1988 Neumarkt, Steinmühle, Kunst für Lebensräume
 1988 Perpignan/Frankreich, Biennale Internationale de l'Estampe
 1991 Bad Kissingen, Galerie Hirnickel
 1991 Köln, Die Weisse Galerie
 1993 Tolentino, Biennale Internazionale dell Umorismo nell'Arte
 1993 Mainz, Galerie Rathaus
 1993 Stettin, Schloß der Pommerschen Fürsten
 1995 Tolentino, Biennale Internazionale dell Umorismo nell'Arte
 1995 New Delhi, Max Müller Bhavan
 2003 München, Galerie Müller+Plate
 2004 München, India Institute 75th Anniversary, at Sotheby's
 2004 New Delhi, NRI artists, National Gallery of Modern Art, New Delhi
 2007 New Delhi/Kolkota, EARTH ON CANVAS – WWF-India
 2007 Lamia Greece, Belle Arte Lamia '07 – videoart

Sources

External links
Comprehensive web page about Mahirwan Mamtani
Centrovision 72. Farbserigraphie auf schwarzgrundigem stärkerem Papier 
Video Creations at YouTube
Website of Dhoomimal Art Centre, New Delhi showing six paintings
Sindhi Art, Mahirwan Mamtani receives Painting Award
Short article at Sindhology.org
Artists' Bluebook
Newspaper Report about his Exhibition in 2009 at Dhoomimal Art Centre, New Delhi 
Entry in British Museum's Database
Goa Art Gallery Showing Three Small Samples
Centrovision 727

Invitation to an Exhibition at Dhoomimal Art Centre, New Delhi with the German Ambassador Bernd Mützelburg 
Mamtani's Homepage
Entry of Collected Works at National Gallery of Modern Art, New Delhi; look for Mamtani, M.

Indian contemporary painters
Indian male painters
Sindhi people
Symbolist painters
Constructivism
20th-century German painters
20th-century German male artists
German male painters
21st-century German painters
21st-century German male artists
Artists from Munich
1935 births
Living people
Academy of Fine Arts, Munich alumni
20th-century Indian painters
20th-century German printmakers
Indian emigrants to Germany
20th-century Indian male artists
21st-century Indian male artists